Land of the blacks may refer to the following places: 

 Land of the Blacks (Manhattan), an historic area in New York City
 Akal n-Iguinawen (Berber, 'land of black people'), referring to the Guinea region or the Sudan region

See also
 Black Country, in England
 Melanesia, etymologically meaning 'islands of black [people]'
 Negroland, an archaic term in European mapping
 Negros (disambiguation)
 Sudan (derived from the Arabic بلاد السودان bilād as-sūdān 'lands of the blacks')
 Zanzibar, whose etymology ultimately means 'land of the blacks'